Opole is a city in southern Poland.

Opole may also refer to:
Opole Lubelskie, a town in eastern Poland
Opole, Łódź Voivodeship (central Poland)
Opole, Lublin Voivodeship (east Poland)
Opole, Masovian Voivodeship (east-central Poland)
Opole (administrative), a generic term for a historical Polish unit of administrative division
Oppilia, known as Opole in Polish, a geographic region of Lviv Oblast
Opolye or Vladimir Opole, a historical region of Russia, a kernel of the medieval state of Vladimir-Suzdal
Opole, Minnesota
Opole (parliamentary constituency), a parliamentary constituency in Poland

See also
Oppeln (disambiguation)